The Gloucestershire Northern Senior League is a football competition based in England founded in 1922. The league is affiliated to the Gloucestershire County FA. It has two divisions, Division One and Division Two, with Division One sitting at level 12 of the English football league system. This league is a feeder to the Gloucestershire County League. The Cheltenham League, Stroud and District League and North Gloucestershire League are feeders to the GNSL.

In the 2018–19 season, Sharpness won the Division One title, while Woolaston were top of Division Two.

History
The league was formed in 1922 and the founder members included Cheltenham Town, Gloucester City and Forest Green Rovers.

A number of clubs in the NSL have played in the Gloucestershire County League or higher but have dropped back into lower tier football.  Notable clubs include:

Harrow Hill joined the County League in 1982/83 and gained promotion to the Hellenic Football League.
Stonehouse Town were original members of the County League and competed in the competition for 20 years until 1988.  From 1947 until 1960 the club played in  the Western Football League.

Among the clubs that have left the Gloucestershire Northern Senior League and now compete at a higher level are:

Bishop's Cleeve
Brimscombe & Thrupp
Cheltenham Town
Cinderford Town
Cirencester Town
Forest Green Rovers
Gloucester City
Longlevens
Lydney Town
Newent Town
Shortwood United
Slimbridge
Tuffley Rovers

Champions 

Sources

Members 2022–23
Source

Division One
 Abbeymead Rovers
 Berkeley Town
 Bredon 
 Brockworth Albion
 Chalford
 Charfield 
 Charlton Rovers
 Cheltenham Athletic 
 Dursley Town
 English Bicknor 
 FC Lakeside
 Longlevens Reserves
 Lydney Town Reserves
 Smiths Barometrics 
 Stonehouse Town Reserves
 Woolaston

Division Two
 Barnwood United
 Bibury 
 Broadwell Amateurs Reserves  
 Cheltenham Civil Service Reserves 
 Chesterton 
 Falcons
 Frampton United Reserves 
 Harrow Hill
 Kings Stanley  
 Leonard Stanley 
 Mushet & Coalway United 
 Staunton & Corse   
 Tewkesbury Town 
 Tredworth Tigers
 Viney St Swithins 
 Whitcroft

External links
Official Website
TheFA.com

References

 
Football leagues in England
Football in Gloucestershire
Sports leagues established in 1922
1922 establishments in England